Balázs Lovrencsics (born 30 August 1991) is a Hungarian football player who plays for Soroksár.

Career

Ferencváros
On 16 July 2017, Lovrencsics played his first match for Ferencváros in a 1-1 drawn against Puskás Akadémia FC in the Hungarian League.

Club statistics

Updated to games played as of 5 December 2018.

References

External links
 Profile at HLSZ 
 Profile at Fradi.hu 
 

1991 births
Living people
Footballers from Budapest
Hungarian footballers
Hungarian people of Croatian descent
Association football forwards
Gödöllői FC footballers
Vác FC players
Soroksári TE footballers
Ferencvárosi TC footballers
Győri ETO FC players
Nemzeti Bajnokság I players
Nemzeti Bajnokság II players